Thousand Hills State Park is a public recreation area covering some   west of Kirksville in Adair County, Missouri. The state park features  Forest Lake and Native American petroglyphs.

History
By the late 1940s, the nearby city of Kirksville was in need of a larger and more reliable water supply than the Chariton River could provide. In October 1948, the family of local physician George Laughlin donated  to the city. The city of Kirksville matched the donation by purchasing an additional . Following voter passage of a special bond issue, land was acquired to construct a dam across Big Creek, a tributary of the Chariton. Upon its completion in summer 1952, the new reservoir was known as "Lake Kirksville" but by September that year the Kirksville city council, through ordinance, officially designed the reservoir "Forest Lake" (with one "r") so named for the surrounding woodlands. The lands, but not the lake itself (owned by the city of Kirksville), were presented to the state of Missouri free of charge in return for the promise of establishing a state park. Upon its official dedication in July 1953, it was named Thousand Hills State Park, in honor of Doctor Laughlin's Thousand Hills Farm that had formerly occupied the land. Missouri Governor Forrest Smith, who attended the 1953 ceremony, has been erroneously linked to several historical accounts that claim Forest Lake was named in his honor.

Petroglyphs
A series of Native American rock carvings, listed on the National Register of Historic Places, are protected in an enclosed observation and interpretation center. The carvings are estimated to date back at least 1,500 years.

Activities and amenities
The park's lake is used for fishing, swimming, and both motorized and non-motorized boating. A marina offers boat and equipment rentals. Two campgrounds provide a total of 57 campsites. Overnight accommodations are also offered at seven duplex cabins. Trails are available for hiking and bicycling and include the Forest Lake Trail, which is being developed in cooperation with the community volunteer organization FLATS (Forest Lake Area Trail System).

Annual events
The park hosts an annual bass tournament in spring. The NEMO Triathlon formerly held in September was discontinued in 2017.

References

External links

Thousand Hills State Park Missouri Department of Natural Resources
Thousand Hills State Park Map Missouri Department of Natural Resources

Protected areas of Adair County, Missouri
State parks of Missouri
National Register of Historic Places in Adair County, Missouri
Archaeological sites on the National Register of Historic Places in Missouri
Petroglyphs in Missouri
Protected areas established in 1952
1952 establishments in Missouri